This is a list of Philippine Basketball Association players by total career games played.

Statistics accurate as of December 22, 2022.

See also
List of Philippine Basketball Association players

References

External links
Philippine Basketball Association All-time Leaders in Most Games Played – PBA Online.net

Games Played